Moshe Biton (born 18 November 1982) is an Israeli footballer.

External links

1982 births
Living people
Israeli footballers
Maccabi Petah Tikva F.C. players
Beitar Jerusalem F.C. players
Bnei Yehuda Tel Aviv F.C. players
Maccabi Tel Aviv F.C. players
Hapoel Haifa F.C. players
Maccabi Jaffa F.C. players
Israeli Premier League players
Footballers from Bat Yam
Israeli people of Moroccan-Jewish descent
Association football forwards
Israel international footballers